The gold tegu, also known as the golden tegu, common tegu, black tegu, Colombian black and white tegu and tiger lizard (in Trinidad), is a species of tegu. Its old scientific name (synonym) was Tupinambis nigropunctatus, but it has since renamed to Tupinambis teguixin.

Gold tegus grow to be about 2 to 3 ft (60 to 100 cm) long on average, and up to 3.5 to 4.0 kg in weight, with a glossy body, powerful limbs and a thick tail. They have many black and gold stripes down their bodies. Gold tegus live in the tropical forests of northern and central South America, as well as in Panama. They feed on insects, other invertebrates (such as snails), small mammals, other reptiles (such as smaller lizards and small snakes) and birds, as well as fish, nesting eggs of birds, turtles and caimans, and sometimes fruit and honey. They typically do not make as good a pet as their larger southern relatives, the Argentine black and white tegu or the red tegu, but if handled frequently, they can make a good pet.

References

Bibliography
 Bartlett, R.D., and Bartlett, P. (2003). Reptiles and Amphibians of the Amazon: An Ecotourist's Guide,

External links

Photos at Animaldiversity.ummz.umich.edu
 Gold tegus @ web.archive.org
Alice Osborne Curwen, "The telencephalon of tupinambis nigropunctatus" Journal of Comparative Neurology (April 1937).
Gold Tegu Care 

Tupinambis
Reptiles of Bolivia
Reptiles of Brazil
Reptiles of Colombia
Reptiles of Ecuador
Reptiles of French Guiana
Reptiles of Guyana
Reptiles of Suriname
Reptiles of Peru
Reptiles of Venezuela
Reptiles described in 1758
Taxa named by Carl Linnaeus